Ras Adiba binti Mohd Radzi (born 27 July 1968) is a Malaysian politician, community activist and former news presenter. She has served on TV3 and NTV7 as a broadcast journalist, television presenter and sports commentator. She is also one of Malaysia's paralympic shooters. Ras Adiba is a broadcast journalist, news anchor, presenter, a poet, director and producer. She was appointed as Senator on 20 May 2020 to represent persons with disabilities. The Senator received the 2023 International Women of Courage Award, which was presented to her and other nominees by Jill Biden and Anthony J. Blinken.

Honour
  :
  Knight Commander of the Order of the Territorial Crown (PMW) – Datuk (2021)
  :
 International Women of Courage Award for demonstrating exceptional courage, strength, and leadership. The award ceremony hosted by the U.S. Department of state.

References 

1968 births
Living people
People from Selangor
Malaysian people of Malay descent
Malaysian Muslims
Malaysian television news anchors
Members of the Dewan Negara
Malaysian activists
Malaysian journalists
Malaysian politicians